William T. Golden Center for Science and Engineering is a high-rise building in Washington, D.C., the capital of the United States. The architects of the building were Davis, Carter, Scott Ltd. and Pei Cobb Freed & Partners, who designed the postmodern building. This building is the headquarters to the American Association for the Advancement of Science, a non-profit organization established in 1848 that aims to advance science around the world. Other tenants include the Association of American Universities and the IRIS Consortium.

The building is named after William T. Golden.

See also
 Renaissance (Bakalar)
 List of tallest buildings in Washington, D.C.

References

Buildings and structures completed in 1996
Skyscraper office buildings in Washington, D.C.
American Association for the Advancement of Science
1996 establishments in Washington, D.C.